The Roman Catholic Archdiocese of Bucaramanga is an archdiocese located in the city of Bucaramanga in Colombia.

History
 17 December 1952: Established as Diocese of Bucaramanga from the Diocese of Nueva Pamplona
 14 December 1974: Promoted as Metropolitan Archdiocese of Bucaramanga

Special churches
Minor Basilicas:
St. John Baptist, Girón

Bishops

Ordinaries
 Bishops of Bucaramanga
Aníbal Muñoz Duque (1952.12.18 – 1959.08.03) Appointed, Archbishop of Nueva Pamplona; future Cardinal
Héctor Rueda Hernández (1960.05.06 – 1974.12.14)
 Archbishops of Bucaramanga
Héctor Rueda Hernández (1974.12.14 – 1991.11.07) Appointed, Archbishop of Medellín
Darío Castrillón Hoyos (1992.12.16 – 1996.06.15) Appointed, Pro-Prefect of the Congregation for the Clergy; future Cardinal
Víctor Manuel López Forero (1998.06.27 – 2009.02.13)
Ismael Rueda Sierra (2009.02.13 – present)

Auxiliary bishops
Isaías Duarte Cancino (1985-1988), appointed Bishop of Apartadó
Héctor Cubillos Peña (2002-2004), appointed Bishop of Zipaquirá
Juan Vicente Cordoba Villota, S.J. (2004-2011), appointed Bishop of Fontibón

Other priests of this diocese who became bishops
Rafael Sarmiento Peralta, appointed Bishop of Ocaña in 1962
Carlos Prada Sanmiguel, appointed Auxiliary Bishop of Medellín in 1988
Jorge Enrique Lozano Zafra, appointed Bishop of Ocaña in 1993
Hency Martínez Vargas (priest here, 1985-1987), appointed Bishop of La Dorada-Guaduas in 2019

Suffragan dioceses
 Barrancabermeja
 Málaga–Soatá
 Socorro y San Gil
 Vélez

See also
Roman Catholicism in Colombia

Sources

External links
 Catholic Hierarchy
 GCatholic.org

Roman Catholic dioceses in Colombia
Roman Catholic Ecclesiastical Province of Bucaramanga
Christian organizations established in 1952
Roman Catholic dioceses and prelatures established in the 20th century
1952 establishments in Colombia